Vladimir Andreevich Steklov (9 January 1864 – 30 May 1926) was a Prominent Russian and Soviet mathematician, mechanician and physicist.

Biography 
Steklov was born in Nizhny Novgorod, Russia. In 1887, he graduated from the Kharkov University, where he was a student of Aleksandr Lyapunov. In 1889–1906 he worked at the Department of Mechanics of this university. He became a full professor in 1896. During 1893–1905 he also taught theoretical mechanics in the Kharkov Polytechnical Institute (now known as Kharkiv Polytechnic Institute). In 1906 he started working at Petersburg University. In 1921 he petitioned for the creation of the Institute of Physics and Mathematics. Upon his death the institute was named after him. The Mathematics Department split from the Institute in 1934. It is now known as Steklov Institute of Mathematics. A lunar impact crater is also named after him.

Steklov's primary scientific contribution was in the area of orthogonal functional sets. He introduced a class of closed orthogonal sets, developed the asymptotic Liouville–Steklov method for orthogonal polynomials, proved theorems on generalized Fourier series, and developed an approximation technique later named Steklov function. He also worked on hydrodynamics and the theory of elasticity.

Steklov wrote a number of works on the history of science. He was an Invited Speaker of the ICM in 1924 in Toronto. In 1926 he was elected a corresponding member of the Göttingen Academy of Sciences and Humanities.

Steklov died in Gaspra, Crimea, USSR (now Gaspra, Russia). He was interred in Saint Petersburg, Russia.

References

External links

 
 
 
 N. Kuznetsov, The Legacy of Vladimir Andreevich Steklov in Mathematical Physics: Work and School.

1864 births
1926 deaths
People from Nizhny Novgorod
People from Nizhny Novgorod Governorate
Soviet physicists
19th-century mathematicians from the Russian Empire
20th-century Russian mathematicians
20th-century Russian physicists
Russian inventors
Soviet mathematicians
Full members of the Saint Petersburg Academy of Sciences
Full Members of the Russian Academy of Sciences (1917–1925)
Full Members of the USSR Academy of Sciences